Kondo is a small village and seat of the commune of Ouro Ardo in the Cercle of Ténenkou in the Mopti Region of southern-central Mali.

References

Populated places in Mopti Region